Albert "Bertie" William Powell (18 July 1873 – 11 September 1948) was a South African sportsman who played both international cricket and rugby union for South Africa.

Powell was born in Kimberley, Cape Colony, in 1873; he was a good all-rounder for the period with safe hands in the field, he played sporadically for Griqualand West from 1892/93 to 1904/05. When Lord Hawke brought England to South Africa in 1898/99, Powell was selected for the second Test, played at Cape Town. Although England won the match comprehensively by 210 runs, despite a first innings deficit of 85, Powell scored 5 and 11 (South Africa's top scorer in their second innings), took 1 wicket for 10 runs and held two catches.

In 1896, Powell played at centre for the South Africa national rugby union team in the third Test of the British Isles tour of South Africa. This would be his one and only international rugby cap.

His death in Rondebosch, Cape Town, in 1948 went unrecorded and therefore no obituary appeared within Wisden for him at the time.

References
  World Cricketers - A Biographical Dictionary by Christopher Martin-Jenkins, published by Oxford University Press (1996),
  The Wisden Book of Test Cricket, Volume 1 (1877–1977) compiled and edited by Bill Frindall, published by Headline Book Publishing (1995),
  www.cricketarchive.com/Archive/Players.

Notes

1873 births
1948 deaths
South Africa Test cricketers
South African cricketers
Griqualand West cricketers
South African rugby union players
South Africa international rugby union players
Rugby union centres